Agnos is a surname. Notable people with the surname include:

Art Agnos (born 1938), American politician
Tom Agnos (1936–2004), American law enforcement officer

See also
 Agno (disambiguation)